Route 402 is a numbered state highway running  in the U.S. state of Rhode Island. Route 402 is a major corridor through both East Greenwich and North Kingstown, and often locally referred to as Frenchtown Road.

Route description
Route 402 begins in East Greenwich at Route 2 (County Trail) and heads east as a four-lane road through a suburban area. It meets Route 4 (Col. Rodman Highway) just east of here at that highway's exit 7A, then passes under Route 403 without access. The road continues east as it exits Kent County and enters the northern portion of North Kingstown, Washington County, where it meets its eastern terminus at an intersection with US 1 (Post Road).

Major intersections

References

External links

2019 Highway Map, Rhode Island

402
Transportation in Kent County, Rhode Island
North Kingstown, Rhode Island
East Greenwich, Rhode Island